Dastan a 1950 Bollywood drama film produced and directed by A. R. Kardar. A box office success, the film became the third highest earning film of 1950, earning an approximate gross of Rs. 1,15,00,000 and net of Rs. 65,00,000 . It stars Raj Kapoor, Suraiya, Veena, Suresh, Al Nasir, Murad and Shakila.

The story, a tragic melodrama, was a narrative in flashback. It was inspired by the film Enchantment (1948), directed by Irving Reis. Cited as "one of the biggest commercial hits" by Patel, Suraiya's acting was stated to have "over-shadowed" that of Raj Kapoor. However, Dastan was Suraiya's last major success as an actress, following which her popularity waned and she was replaced by Madhubala as the top female star.

Cast
 Raj Kapoor as Raj
 Suraiya as Indira
 Veena as Rani
 Suresh as Ramesh
 Al Nasir as Kundan
 Protima Devi as Ramesh's Mother 
 Murad as Father
 Banerji as Shambhu Dada
 Lakshman
 Surinder
 Shakila
 Baby Anwari
 Swartha
 Krishna Kumar

Soundtrack
The music was composed by Naushad and the lyricist was Shakeel Badayuni. The singers were Suraiya and Mohammed Rafi. Some of the notable numbers from this film included Suraiya's "Yeh Sawan Ki Rut Tum Aur Hum", "Yeh Mausam Aur Yeh Tanhai", "Ae Sham Tu Bata" and "Naam Tera Hai Zuban Par".

Song list

References

External links
 

1950 films
1950s Hindi-language films
1950 drama films
Films scored by Naushad
Films directed by A. R. Kardar
Indian drama films
Indian black-and-white films